Blackpool North may refer to;

 Blackpool North railway station, a railway station in Blackpool, Lancashire, England
 Blackpool North (UK Parliament constituency), a UK Parliament constituency from 1945 to 1997
 Blackpool North and Fleetwood (UK Parliament constituency), a UK Parliament constituency from 1997 to 2010
 Blackpool North and Cleveleys (UK Parliament constituency), a current UK Parliament constituency